Vaughan-Lee may refer to:

Charles Vaughan-Lee (1867–1928), British navy admiral
Emmanuel Vaughan-Lee (born 1979), British filmmaker
Llewellyn Vaughan-Lee (born 1953), British mystic
Michael Vaughan-Lee, British mathematician
Patrick Vaughan Lee (1931–2010), Canadian bishop
Vaughan Vaughan-Lee (1836–1882), British politician

Others
Vaughan Lee (fighter)

See also

Vaughan (surname)
Lee (English surname)

Compound surnames
English-language surnames
Surnames of English origin